DADiSP (Data Analysis and Display, pronounced day-disp) is a numerical computing environment developed by DSP Development Corporation which allows one to display and manipulate data series, matrices and images with an interface similar to a spreadsheet. DADiSP is used in the study of signal processing, numerical analysis, statistical and physiological data processing.

Interface 

DADiSP is designed to perform technical data analysis in a spreadsheet like environment. However, unlike a typical business spreadsheet that operates on a table of cells each of which contain single scalar values, a DADiSP Worksheet consists of multiple interrelated windows where each window contains an entire series or multi-column matrix. A window not only stores the data, but also displays the data in several interactive forms, including 2D graphs, XYZ plots, 3D surfaces, images and numeric tables. Like a traditional spreadsheet, the windows are linked such that a change to the data in one window automatically updates all dependent windows both numerically and graphically.
Users manipulate data primarily through windows. A DADiSP window is normally referred to by the letter "W" followed by a window number, as in "W1". For example, the formula W1: 1..3 assigns the series values {1, 2, 3} to "W1". The formula W2: W1*W1 sets a second window to compute the square of each value in "W1" such that "W2" will contain the series {1, 4, 9}. If the values of "W1" change to {3, 5, 2, 4}, the values of "W2" automatically update to {9, 25, 4, 16}.

Programming language 

DADiSP includes a series based programming language called SPL (Series Processing Language) used to implement custom algorithms. SPL has a C/C++ like syntax and is incrementally compiled into intermediate bytecode, which is executed by a virtual machine. SPL supports both standard variables assigned with = and "hot" variables assigned with :=. For example, the statement A = 1..3 assigns the series {1, 2, 3} to the standard variable "A". The square of the values can be assigned with B = A * A. Variable "B" contains the series {1, 4, 9}. If "A" changes, "B" does not change because "B" preserves the values as assigned without regard to the future state of "A". However, the statement A := 1..3 creates a "hot" variable. A hot variable is analogous to a window, except hot variables do not display their data. The assignment B := A * A computes the square of the values of "A" as before, but now if "A" changes, "B" automatically updates. Setting A = {3, 5, 2, 4} causes "B" to automatically update with {9, 25, 4, 16}.

History 

DADiSP was originally developed in the early 1980s as part of a research project at MIT to explore the aerodynamics of Formula One racing cars. The original goal of the project was to enable researchers to quickly explore data analysis algorithms without the need for traditional programming.

Version history 

 DADiSP 6.7 B02, Jan 2017
 DADiSP 6.7 B01, Oct 2015
 DADiSP 6.5 B05, Dec 2012
 DADiSP 6.5, May 2010 
 DADiSP 6.0, Sep 2002
 DADiSP 5.0, Oct 2000
 DADiSP 4.1, Dec 1997
 DADiSP 4.0, Jul 1995
 DADiSP 3.01, Feb 1993
 DADiSP 2.0, Feb 1992
 DADiSP 1.05, May 1989
 DADiSP 1.03, Apr 1987

See also 

 List of numerical-analysis software
 Comparison of numerical-analysis software

References

Further reading 

 Allen Brown, Zhang Jun: First Course In Digital Signal Processing Using DADiSP, Abramis, 
 Charles Stephen Lessard: Signal Processing of Random Physiological Signals (Google eBook), Morgan & Claypool Publishers

External links 

 DSP Development Corporation (DADiSP vendor)
 DADiSP Online Help
 DADiSP Tutorials
 Getting Started with DADiSP
 Introduction to DADiSP

Data analysis software
Data-centric programming languages
Data mining and machine learning software
Numerical linear algebra
Data visualization software
Statistical programming languages
C (programming language) software
Software modeling language